Shorea palosapis is a flowering plant in the family Dipterocarpaceae. It is commonly called (along with some other species in the genus Shorea) Philippine mahogany or white lauan. It is endemic to the Philippines.

References

palosapis
Endemic flora of the Philippines
Trees of the Philippines
Least concern plants
Taxonomy articles created by Polbot
Taxa named by Francisco Manuel Blanco